|}

The November Novices' Chase, currently known as the Paddy Power Arkle Challenge Trophy Trial Novices' Chase, is a Grade 2 National Hunt chase in Great Britain which is open to horses aged four years or older. It is run on the Old Course at Cheltenham over a distance of about 2 miles (1 mile 7 furlongs and 199 yards, or 3,199 metres), and during its running there are twelve fences to be jumped. The race is for novice chasers, and it is scheduled to take place each year in November.

The event was formerly known as the Coventry Novices' Chase, and for a period it was classed at Listed level. It was given the title of the November Novices' Chase and promoted to Grade 2 status in 1994. The race was sponsored by The Independent from 2000 to 2011 before the Racing Post took over sponsorship in 2012 and renamed it the Arkle Trophy Trial Novices' Chase. Paddy Power began sponsoring the race in 2022.

Winners since 1987

See also
 Horse racing in Great Britain
 List of British National Hunt races

References
 Racing Post:
 pedigreequery.com – November Novices' Chase – Cheltenham.

National Hunt races in Great Britain
Cheltenham Racecourse
National Hunt chases